Ülo Jõgi (12 March 1921, in Tallinn – 14 May 2007, in Tallinn) was an Estonian war historian who was active in the Estonian resistance against the Soviet occupation of Estonia.

On 11 December 1944, Jõgi (former member of Erna long-range recce group, organized by Finnish Army together with Nazi Germany) was arrested by the Soviet authorities, accused of spying for UK. Months later, he was sent to a Gulag labor camp in the Komi Republic, to the west of the Ural mountains in the north-east of the East European Plain. He was exiled from the Estonian SSR for life, but was eventually released in 1970. He returned to Keila, Estonia, a year later. During his exile, he married Aili Jõgi, a fellow Estonian who had been deported in 1946 for having blown up the preceding monument to the Soviet Bronze Soldier in Tallinn.

In February 1997, Jõgi was awarded the Estonian Order of the Cross of the Eagle for his fight against Soviet occupation ("Freedom fighter of military merit") by the Estonian President Lennart Meri.

References 

 Suri Erna salga liige Ülo Jõgi Postimees, 15 May 2007. 
 Decorations of the Republic of Estonia : Awarded in 1995 - 1998
 Erna salga liige Ülo Jõgi saadeti viimsele teekonnale 
 Aaviksoo: oma vabaduse võlgneme inimestele nagu Ülo Jõgi 
 Mart Laar: Ülo Jõgi: Erna võitles Eesti eest!, 23 August 2007 Maaleht

1921 births
2007 deaths
People from Tallinn
Writers from Tallinn
Estonian non-fiction writers
20th-century Estonian writers
Tallinn University of Technology alumni
Soviet people accused of spying for the West
Gulag detainees
Recipients of the Military Order of the Cross of the Eagle, Class III
Estonian spies